Norman Ernest Alden (3 November 1909 – 1980) was a footballer who played in the English Football League for Oldham Athletic and Southport. He also played for Merthyr Town, Liverpool and Hereford United. He was born in Caerphilly, Wales.

Playing career 
In December 1933 he was transferred from Merthyr Town to Liverpool, where he played for the reserves and in local senior cup ties, but never played for the first team and moved on in 1935.

In the summer of 1935 he moved to Oldham Athletic but he only managed one appearance against Mansfield Town on the opening day of the season, 1936 he moved to Southport, where yet again his appearances were limited, this time due to the arrival of forward Joe Patrick. He finished his playing career at Hereford when transferred there in 1937.

References

Welsh footballers
Southport F.C. players
Liverpool F.C. players
Hereford United F.C. players
Oldham Athletic A.F.C. players
English Football League players
1909 births
1980 deaths
Association football forwards
Merthyr Town F.C. players